Adolphe Benoît Blaise was an 18th-century French bassoonist and composer, died in 1772.

He joined the orchestra of the Comédie-Italienne in 1737 and composed the music for Le petit maistre in 1738. In 1743, he was head of the orchestra of the Foire Saint-Laurent and in 1744 of that of the Foire Saint-Germain. From 1753 to 1760, 
he was director of the orchestra of the Comédie-Italienne and composed many ballets, divertissements, dances, parodies, pantomimes and overall the music for the successful comedy by Justine Favart Annette et Lubin (1762) and two comedies by Favart: Isabelle et Gertrude (1765) and finally La Rosière de Salency (1769).

Bibliography

External links 
 Blaise's works and their presentations on CÉSAR
 Adolphe Blaise on Data.bnf.fr

French male classical composers
French opera composers
Male opera composers
French ballet composers
French conductors (music)
French male conductors (music)
French classical bassoonists
Year of birth missing
1772 deaths